General Donaldson may refer to:

Hay Frederick Donaldson (1856–1916), British Army brigadier general
James Lowry Donaldson (1814–1885), Union Army brigadier general
John W. Donaldson (1924–2008), U.S. Army brigadier general